Sven Thomas Magnusson (born 23 October 1963), known by his stage names Thomas Di Leva or simply Di Leva, is a Swedish singer and songwriter.

Biography
Sven Thomas Magnusson was born 1963 in Gävle, Gävleborg County, Gästrikland, Sweden. At 14 years of age, he changed his name from Magnusson to Di Leva, inspired both by his mother's Italian maiden name and idols like Leonardo da Vinci and Charlie Chaplin. Thomas started his career with the band The Pillisnorks, debuting with the EP 4 Visitors on 1 January 1980. Later, Di Leva formed the band Modern Art, which subsequently became Modærn Art. In autumn 1981, Di Leva signed a record contract as a solo artist with the recently started company Adventure. The following year, Di Leva released his debut album, Marginal Cirkus. After a short time at the company Stranded, Billy Bolero took Di Leva to the newly started company Papa Records, and with the release of the album På ett fat Di Leva became known throughout the country. Di Leva said "I want to create great art in the form of simple music for the large audience." With the song "Kom till mig", recorded with strings from Fläskkvartetten and Raj Montana Band, Di Leva reached the Trackslistan ranking in 1985 for the first time and made his first hit. The following year he released his third album, Pussel.

Vem ska jag tro på was released in autumn 1987 and became Di Leva's breakthrough album. The album was produced in the cellar of record company Mistlurs Records at Roslags Street with 2nd producer Kaj Erixon. On the album's first track, "I morgon", new tone atmosphere and new sound effects can be heard, with Johan Vävare performing using oscillator and keyboard sounds. The album was nominated by Slitz as best album of the year and placed second in the Aftonbladet re-vote of the yearly Rockbjörnen award in the category 'Best Swedish album'. He took part in Melodifestivalen 2012 with the song "Ge aldrig upp (Never give up)" but failed to qualify to the finals.

Discography

Albums 
(Credited as Di Leva, except where indicated)

Compilation albums

Singles 
(Vinyl 1980–1991/1993) (CD 1988/1990–2004)

Charting singles

Other singles 
 1980 The Pillisnorks: 4 Visitors
 1981 Modaern Art: Circle in different shapes
 1981 Modaern Art: Envy/Magic Place
 1982 Johan Vävares Tango: (Nu tändas åter ljusen) I min lilla stad 
 1982 Single man / Appear of need
 1983 Om jag vill
 1984 Bring me a magician / The dirty clown
 1985 Två på skilda håll / Rätt & fel
 1985 Kom till mig / Vem älskar du?
 1986 Snurra bakåt ! / Himlen (Heaven)
 1986 Glad att du ännu har tårar / Fördämningen
 1987 Vem ska jag tro på / Tycker om
 1988 Du är precis / Söta lilla blomma
 1988 Dansa din djävul / Snart bländar solstrålar
 1989 Vi har bara varandra / Du ger/du gör
 1989 Om du vore här nu / Om du längtar
 1990 Själens krigare / Struntar i dig
 1991 Dansa naken med mig / Själens krigare (solid bass mix) / Själens krigare (Extended 12" mix)
 1993 Naked number one (French clubmix) / Naked number one (Original version) / Naked number one (French submix) / Polish meditation (Feel it loud)
 1993 Naked number one / Naked number one (Eternal heart mix) / Naked number one (The gathering) / It is accomplished
 1993 Adam & Eve (Sunflash remix) / Adam & Eve (Giant orange) / Adam & Eve (Original version) / Drive me wild
 1993 Mr Thomas
 1994 Everyone is Jesus / Coca-cola Angel / Everyone is Jesus (Dancing mantra mix) / Everyone is Jesus (Meditation mix)
 1995 Love the children / Say yes
 1996 Den glada stjärnan / Happy star / Happy star (Spacepeace remix) / Golden ray
 1997 Svarta pärlan i London / Spelar helt normal / Svarta pärlan (Röd remix) / Hjälpa till
 1997 Regnbågsdiamant / Maya / 303 / Den enda här på jorden
 1999 Miraklet / Den oemotståndlige
 2000 Vi får vingar när vi älskar/Rymdens Ros
 2000 Solsjäl/Håll mig
 2000 Man av färger/Paradisbröllop
 2004 Vad är frihet?/Långt Inuti
 2004 Tiden faller
 2006 Ingen kan köpa livet
 2008 Öppna ditt Hjärta
 2009 Hopp och Förtvivlan
 2009 Let's Dance
 2010 Another Day In Paradise
 2011 Välkommen Hem

Others 
Fred i rörelse, a free song from Di Leva's website.
Jag äter inte mina vänner, song with Refused on Djurens rätts compilation album Defenders of the oppressed breed.
Stolt, song with Lars Demian on his record Elvis & Jesus & jag.
Vad bryr sig kärleken, song with Mikael Wiehe on his record Sevilla.
Kom och håll om mig, duet with Nike Gurra on the record Hula Hula [1987].

Television, theatre, etc.

Television 
Sommarmorgon, TV 1, 1987
Smash!, TV 1, 1989
Kenny Starfighter, TV 1, 1997

Radio 
Sommar, P1, 1987
Alkemisternas blandning, 1991
Sommar, P1 Tuesday June 10 13:05, 1997

Theatre 
Mahagonny (Berthold Brecht/Director: Peter Haber) theatre in Gävleborg, 1987
Hamlet (William Shakespeare/Director: Peter Oskarson) Folk theatre in Gävleborg 1989-90

Film 
I morgon & i morgon & i morgon. (Director: Stig Björkman, 1989)

Publications 
Nu [1988]
Contribution to B Åkerlunds book Insida svenska personligheter. [1992]
Prologue in T Jönssons book Tarot, den inre världsomseglingen. [1996]

Citations

External links 

 
 
 

1963 births
Living people
Swedish people of Italian descent
Swedish male singers
Sommar (radio program) hosts
Melodifestivalen contestants of 2012